The issue of match fixing in association football has been described, in 2013, by Chris Eaton, the former Head of Security of FIFA (the sport's world governing body), as a "crisis", while UEFA's president Michel Platini has said that if it continues, "football is dead." Zhang Jilong, president of the Asian Football Confederation, has stated that it is a "pandemic." The issue also affects a number of other sports across the world.

In May 2011, world governing body FIFA announced an anti-match fixing plan, and in September 2012 FIFA President Sepp Blatter warned that match-fixing endangered "the integrity of the game." In September 2014 the Council of Europe also announced they would tackle the problem.

A number of clubs in countries across the world have been subject to match fixing, including Australia, China, and Spain. The South African national team has also been investigated.

In the 18 months prior to February 2013, Europol investigated 680 matches in 30 countries. In November 2013, 11 men were charged in Estonia with fixing 17 matches.

The problem is often attributed to criminal gangs based in Asia, who generate "hundreds of billions of euros per year."

Players who have publicly rejected bribes have been praised.

Algeria
In September 2018, the BBC reported on match fixing in Algerian football.

Azerbaijan
On 30 November 2017, Keshla FK confirmed that they had terminated the contracts of Nizami Hajiyev and Mirhüseyn Seyidov due to suspicion of match manipulating, with both also being arrested. The following day, 1 December 2017, both Hajiyev and Seyidov were banned from all footballing activities by the AFFA.
In December 2019, Jamshid Maharramov was arrested in relation to match-fixing allegations that saw him banned from football by the AFFA in 2017.

Bangladesh
On 29 August 2021, Arambagh KS were found guilty of spot-fixing, match manipulations and live and online betting. Bangladesh Football Federation disciplinary committee fined 5 lakhs BDT & banned Arambagh for two years from Second Division League and relegated them to the Dhaka Senior Division Football League, which is the country's third tier.

Belgium
In October 2018, 14 people, including two referees, were arrested and charged with bribery involving two relegation battles in a match-fixing investigation.

Benin
In April 2019 ex-Benin international Séïdath Tchomogo was one of four African former international footballers banned for life by FIFA due to "match manipulation".

Canada

The Canadian Soccer League (CSL) is an unsanctioned semi-professional league in Canada, formerly sanctioned by the Canadian Soccer Association (CSA). Despite its name, the CSL is not a national league as the teams are located solely in Southern Ontario. On 12 September 2012, the Canadian Broadcasting Corporation reported that a CSL game held in September 2009 was fixed. On 31 January 2013, the CSA announced it was decertifying the league.  Following the 2013 announcement, the Canadian MLS teams Toronto FC and Montreal Impact both withdrew their academy teams, Toronto FC Academy and Montreal Impact Academy from participation in the CSL.

The CSL continued to operate after decertification by the CSA. The International Centre for Sport Security (ICSS) later reported that 42% of matches in the "rogue league's" 2015 season showed signs of suspicious betting activity. In 2016, the Royal Canadian Mounted Police opened investigations in the alleged CSL match fixing.

China

The "Five Jia B Rats incident" was a series of match fixing incidents that involved five football teams in the final rounds of the 2001 second-tier Jia B League (present day China League One). Referee Gong Jianping served 18 months in prison before dying of leukemia.

From 2009 to 2011, a large-scale 2009–2013 investigation by the Ministry of Public Security of China revealed many match-fixing scandals that occurred mainly between 2003 and 2009 in Chinese top-two tier leagues. As a result, Shanghai Shenhua F.C. was stripped of their 2003 top-tier league title. Former vice presidents of Chinese Football Association Xie Yalong, Nan Yong and Yang Yimin were sentenced to 10.5 years in jail. FIFA World Cup referee Lu Jun, and China national football team players Shen Si, Jiang Jin, Qi Hong, Li Ming, were sentenced to 5.5 years or 6 years in jail.

El Salvador
On 20 September 2013, the Salvadoran Football Federation banned 14 Salvadoran players for life, and three other players for shorter periods, due to their involvement with match fixing while playing with the El Salvador national football team at various matches during the period 2010–2012. Those banned for life were Dennis Alas, Luis Anaya, Darwin Bonilla, Cristian Castillo, Ramón Flores, Marvin González, Miguel Granada, José Henríquez, Reynaldo Hernández, Miguel Montes, Alfredo Pacheco, Dagoberto Portillo, Osael Romero, Ramón Sánchez and Miguel Montes.

The match fixers included some of El Salvador's most noted players. Sánchez had served as the team captain at the 2009 CONCACAF Gold Cup. González had been captain at the 2011 CONCACAF Gold Cup, when he and seven other of these players fixed the result in a 5–0 loss to the Mexico national football team. At the time of the ban, Pacheco held the record for most appearances on the El Salvador national football team; he was murdered in 2015 when leaving a bathroom at a gas station in Santa Ana, El Salvador. Castillo (D.C. United) and Romero (Chivas USA) had both played in Major League Soccer.

England

Six people, including three current players and ex-player Delroy Facey, were arrested in November 2013 on suspicion of match fixing. Two Singaporean men were later charged, while two non-league footballers for Whitehawk were also charged in December 2013. As a result of this investigation, three people were jailed in June 2014.

Later that month, professional footballer Sam Sodje was investigated after he was filmed by an undercover journalist claiming to have fixed matches; a total of six people were arrested, including active player DJ Campbell. Campbell was later cleared of all allegations. Cristian Montaño was also named as one of those arrested, and he was later sacked by club Oldham Athletic. Montaño later denied the accusations. In March 2014 the six players were re-arrested, alongside seven new players, all based in North-West England. The seven new players arrested were later named as John Welsh, Keith Keane, Bailey Wright, David Buchanan, Ben Davies and Graham Cummins (who all play for Preston North End), and Stephen Dawson (who plays for Barnsley); all seven stated they were innocent. The men were late released from bail. In January 2015 all 13 players were released without charge.

Representatives from a number of sports met in December 2013 to discuss the issue, while former player Alan Shearer stated there should be a "zero tolerance" approach to the problem. Darren Bailey of the FA also stated that the country's gambling laws did not help in tackling match fixing in the sport.

In June 2014, it was announced that 13 games were believed to have been fixed in British football during the 2013–14 season.

On 1 September 2014 former professional player Delroy Facey was charged over alleged match fixing. The trial began in April 2015, when he was accused of being a "middleman" for others who had already been convicted of the crime. After being found guilty later that month he was sentenced to two-and-a-half years in jail.

In October 2022, non-league player Kynan Isaac was banned for 10 years for spot fixing in a FA Cup match.

France
In November 2014, the presidents of Ligue 2 clubs Caen and Nîmes were amongst several arrested on suspicion of match fixing. The arrests followed a 1–1 draw between Caen and Nîmes in May 2014, a result very beneficial for each club.

In April 2019, Guingamp complained to the LFP about a game between Caen and Angers. The LFP said they were investigating "doubts about the integrity" of the result.

Greece

Corruption has long been endemic in Greek football.

Italy
 1948 Caso Napoli
 1980 Totonero
 1986 Totonero
 2005 Caso Genoa
 2006 Calciopoli
 2011–12 Italian football match-fixing scandal
 2015 Italian football match-fixing scandal

In June 2018, prosecutors began investigating Parma in relation to alleged match-fixing. In July 2018 Parma player Emanuele Calaiò received a two-year ban after being found guilty of match fixing for “eliciting reduced effort” through text messages to Spezia players in their final match of the 2017–18 Serie B to gain promotion; Parma received a 5-point deduction for the 2018–19 Serie A. On 9 August, Parma had the 5-point deduction expunged and Calaiò's ban reduced, expiring on 31 December 2018.

Kenya
In February 2019 ex-international player George Owino was named in a FIFA report that alleged he had been involved in match fixing. In April 2019 Owino was one of four African former international footballers banned for life by FIFA due to "match manipulation".

Lebanon 
The 2013 Lebanese match fixing scandal involved 24 players, with two (Ramez Dayoub and Mahmoud El Ali) being banned from the sport for life.

Liberia
In August 2019 referee Josephus Torjilar was banned for two years for bribery.

Malawi
In April 2019 ex-Malawi international Hellings Mwakasungula was one of four African former international footballers banned for life by FIFA due to "match manipulation".

Nepal
On 14 October 2015, the Kathmandu Police arrested five Nepalese national team players suspected of match fixing in the world cup qualifiers 2011. The arrest was based on information coming from AFC and their collaboration with Sportradar Security Services.

In November 2015, these five Nepalese players appeared in court charged with match-fixing.

Nigeria
In August 2019 Samson Siasia was handed a lifetime ban by FIFA related to match fixing. He said he would appeal but was in no rush to do so.

Portugal
In 2004, Polícia Judiciária (Portuguese Judiciary Police) launched the operation Apito Dourado and named several Portuguese club presidents and football personalities as suspects of match fixing, most notably FC Porto's chairman Pinto da Costa. Some of the wiretaps used as proof, which were deemed unusable in court, can be found on YouTube.

Romania

Serbia
In January 2008, the president Ratko Butorović of Serbian first division side Vojvodina Novi Sad, stadium director Milan Čabrić and referees Mihajlo Jeknić, Borislav Kasanski and Goran Kovačević were amongst several arrested on suspicion of match fixing.

Ratko Butorović nicknamed Bata Kankan was arrested on suspicion of bribing referee Mihajlo Jeknic with 4,000 Euros to lead the match at Lučani on 12 December last year in favor of Butorović's Vojvodina Novi Sad that was a visitor.

In October 2009, Serbia beat Romania in a suspicious 5–0 in Belgrade in a FIFA World Cup 2010 qualifying match. After the defeat the Romanian team headed to their hotel in Belgrade and some journalists saw Adrian Mutu leaving to celebrate with Butorović.

In June 2012, Serbia U-19 side played Romania in 2012 UEFA European Under-19 Championship elite qualification the Serbs won 3–0 in Serbia, before the match three Romanian players were seen taking photos with Butorović.

According to Mirko Poledica President of the Sindicate of Professional Footballers in Serbia, it had been a public secret for years that matches were fixed in the country's football championships. 'People have known about match-fixing for a long time, but this is the first time that players talk about it in public. Unfortunately, there is a lot of crime and there are a lot of hooligans in Serbian football. Many of those who know something, have no courage to talk about fixed matches, because of their personal safety. Some of the players have received threatening text messages: if they do not keep quiet, they will suffer serious consequences.'

Sierra Leone
In July 2014 a total of 15 people were indefinitely suspended by the Sierra Leone Football Association over allegations of match-fixing - 4 players (Ibrahim Kargbo, Ibrahim Koroma, Samuel Barlay and Christian Caulker) as well as 3 referees and 8 officials, including Rodney Michael. Koroma later denied the allegations, and an inquiry into the allegations was also announced. The bans on the 15 players was lifted in March 2015.

In April 2019 ex-Sierra Leone international Ibrahim Kargbo was one of four African former international footballers banned for life by FIFA due to "match manipulation".

Spain
In May 2019 a number of people (including current and former players) were arrested by police in Spain investigating match-fixing allegations.

Sweden
In November 2019 Nigerian player Dickson Etuhu was found guilty of match fixing by a Swedish court, and said he would appeal. Both Defence and Prosecution said they would appeal the sentence.

Tajikistan
In August 2021, Iranian forward Amir Memari Manesh was banned for life by the Tajikistan Football Federation for admitting to betting on his own games with Dushanbe-83.

Togo
In March 2019, Togolese referee Kokou Hougnimon Fagla was banned for life by FIFA due to match fixing. He denied that he had done so.

Ukraine
In May 2018, 35 Ukrainian clubs were accused of match-fixing.

Uzbekistan
In September 2022, Georgian midfielder Kakhi Makharadze was handed a five-year ban for match fixing involving his club Lokomotiv Tashkent.

References

Association football
Association football controversies
Association football culture